Takhtshah may refer to:
 Takhtshah-e Pain